The 2017–18 Israeli League season will be the 27th season of ice hockey in Israel and 6th season of Top League.  Rishon Devils are the current champions, after winning the 2016-17 Israeli Hockey League season.  Holon Ninjas were promoted from the second division and are playing in the top division of Israel Hockey for the very first time.

Teams

Regular season

Standings

Table

Play-offs

Player statistics

Scoring leaders
The following players led the league in regular season and play-offs points at the conclusion of games played on Mai 29, 2018.

References

External links 
 
Ice hockey federation of Israel israhockey.co.il
Standings of teams israhockey.co.il
Schedule & Scores israhockey.co.il
2017 - 2018 REGULAR SEASON STATS eliteprospects.com
Champions of Israel on the site hockeyarenas 
Final HC Bat-Yam - CIHS

Israeli League
Israeli League (ice hockey) seasons
Seasons